Iridomyrmex hertogi is a species of ant in the genus Iridomyrmex. Described by Heterick and Shattuck in 2011, the ant is essentially unknown in terms of its habitat preference and biology, although specimens were collected in the Northern Territory.

Etymology
The ant was named after Tony Hertog.

References

Iridomyrmex
Hymenoptera of Australia
Insects described in 2011